Greenlawns High School is a co-educational private school in Mumbai, India;  It was founded in 1959 by an English woman, Daphne Clare Fraser-Thomson, who was the school's first principal. When she returned to the UK in 1969, she passed on the principal's chair to the then vice-principal Sara D'Mello who was singularly responsible for maintaining the high standards in education and personality development established by Fraser-Thomson.

The school is by Scandal Point on Bomanji Petit Road Breach Candy, considered to be India's most expensive residential area.

Houses

The system of election for the student council is a democratic one where students vote for candidates for house captains or head pupils. The four houses being colours Red, Blue, Green and Yellow

Notable alumni
 Karan Johar, Film producer
 Twinkle Khanna, Film Actress, Producer, Author, Columnist
 Ameera Shah, Entrepreneur
 Nikhil Advani, Film director
 Neil Nitin Mukesh, Actor
 Darsheel Safary, Actor

References

External links
Schools in Mumbai
 Official website

Private schools in Mumbai
High schools and secondary schools in Mumbai
Educational institutions established in 1959
1959 establishments in Bombay State